Kalin Iliev is a Bulgarian writer, dramatist and publicist. The author of over 20 plays, he has also written The Last Postman (2006) and The Spring of the Emigrants (2013). He has had more than 30 publications and productions of his plays on the stages of Bulgarian theatres

Recognition 
Iliev has won Bulgarian and International literary awards. He is a member of the Society of Dramatic Authors and Composers.

Literature 
The Last Postmen - novel
Story of the Mixed-Up Kingdom 
Spring of Immigrants - novel
Spring of Immigrants. Morpho - novel,

Dramaturgy 
Maximum
Dead Sea 
The Hunter 
The Big Mama 
The Ball of the Snakes 
The Border  ,
The Key 
The Bed-wetter 
A Fairy Tale About the End 
The Brothel

Cinema and video 
The Border - Paris, France
The Bed Wetter
A Fairy Tale About the End
The Key
A Fairy Tale about the Incoherent Kingdom
A Fairy Tale About the End (Romania) 
The Border (Kyiv, Ukraine)
The Border (Glasgow, UK)
The Big Mama (Pernik, Bulgaria)

Reviews 
Publication of Letter the performance - magazine - France Review ART-SCENE  
The Border - Theatre 14 (Paris) July 2009  
The Last Postman - Janet 45
International Theatre Research Magazine Oxford University, summer 2002 by ph.d Svetlana Pancheva 
Poveste despre sfarsitul lumii
Story of the Mixed-Up Kingdom - annotation 
У КИЄВІ ПРЕДСТАВИЛИ УКРАЇНСЬКО-БОЛГАРСЬКУ ВИСТАВУ «МАМО, ДЕ ТИ?» (ВСЕ ЗА ФРЕЙДОМ) - annotation 
У столичному Колесі болгарський режисер поставив драму земляка - annotation

References 

1956 births
Living people
Bulgarian dramatists and playwrights
Bulgarian writers
Public relations people